Aaron Black (born 25 December 1992) is an Australian rules footballer currently playing for the West Perth Football Club in the West Australian Football League (WAFL).

WAFL career
Black made his league debut for West Perth in round 16 of the 2010 season and was a member of the 2013 premiership team.
He made his state debut for Western Australia in 2013.

In 2014, Black won the Sandover Medal for the best and fairest player in the WAFL with 47 votes.

AFL career
In Round 2 of the 2022 AFL Season Aaron made his AFL debut for the West Coast Eagles against North Melbourne at Marvel Stadium. In his debut game, he collected 15 disposals and kicked a goal.

Statistics
Statistics are correct to the end of the 2021 season

|- style="background-color: #eaeaea"
| scope="row" | 2022 ||  || 47
| 1 || 1 || 0 || 11 || 4 || 15 || 2 || 4 || 1 || 0 || 11 || 4 || 15 || 4 || 2 
|- class="sortbottom"
! colspan=3| Career
! 1 !! 1 !! 0 !! 11 !! 4 !! 15 !! 2 !! 4 !! 1 !! 0 !! 11 !! 4 !! 15 !! 4 !! 2 
|}

References

External links
WAFL playing statistics

Living people
1992 births
West Perth Football Club players
Australian rules footballers from Western Australia
Sandover Medal winners
Place of birth missing (living people)
West Coast Eagles players